Benjamin Grubb Humphreys (August 26, 1808December 20, 1882) was an American politician from Mississippi. He was a general in the Confederate States Army during the American Civil War and served as Governor of Mississippi from 1865 to 1868, during Reconstruction.

Early life
Humphreys was born in Claiborne County in the Territory of Mississippi, on the Bayou Pierre. He was educated in New Jersey and enrolled at United States Military Academy in the same class as Robert E. Lee and Joseph E. Johnston. However, he was expelled in 1826 when he participated in a "Christmas frolic" that ended up turning into the Eggnog Riot.

Upon his return to Mississippi, he was elected to the state senate representing his native county, serving from 1839 to 1844. In 1846, he moved to Sunflower County, Mississippi, and founded Itta Bena. He developed a cotton plantation there.

Civil War
During the American Civil War, Humphreys raised a company and was commissioned a captain in the Confederate States Army in 1861. Part of the 21st Mississippi Infantry Regiment, he was elected to the rank of colonel the same year and brigaded with other regiments under the command of Brig. Gen. William Barksdale in the Eastern Theater. At the Battle of Gettysburg in 1863, Humphreys's regiment was part of the force that attacked U.S. Army positions at the Peach Orchard, driving the U.S. soldiers back toward Cemetery Ridge. Humphreys took command of the brigade after the death of Barksdale. He was subsequently promoted to brigadier general, and remained in command until he was wounded in the battle of Berryville, Virginia, on September 3, 1864. Humphreys returned home to Mississippi to heal but could not return to active duty before the war ended.

Political career
After the Confederate States Army surrendered and the Confederate government dissolved, secessionist politicians and military officers were not automatically pardoned. They were forbidden to hold public office in the United States. Benjamin Humphreys was unpardoned when he announced his candidacy for Mississippi governor, and President Andrew Johnson did not want him elected. Unwilling to withdraw his candidacy, on October 2, 1865, Humphreys was elected as a Democrat but was not immediately recognized as the Governor of Mississippi. Without presidential approval, on October 16, 1865, Humphreys had himself inaugurated and sworn in as the 26th Governor of Mississippi. By October 26, 1865, Mississippi provisional Governor, William L. Sharkey, received from President Andrew Johnson a pardon authorizing political office under the Reconstruction plan. Humphreys won re-election in 1868 and continued with a second term. Nevertheless, with the beginning of Congressional control of Reconstruction, he was physically removed by occupying U.S. Armed Forces on June 15, 1868.

As a Democratic Governor of the State of Mississippi, he sympathized with the ideology of White supremacy. In his own words:

After he retired from politics, Humphreys entered a career in insurance in Jackson, Mississippi. He continued there until his retirement in 1877, when he moved to his plantation in Leflore County, Mississippi, where he died in 1882. He is buried in Wintergreen Cemetery, Port Gibson, Mississippi.

Humphreys County, Mississippi, is named after him. His son, Benjamin G. Humphreys II, entered into his own political career. He became a member of Congress and was on the Harbors and Rivers Committee, where he was instrumental in the successful amendment that created and added levees to the commission's charter.

See also
List of American Civil War generals (Confederate)

Notes

References
 McKitrick, Eric L. "Andrew Johnson and Reconstruction". New York, NY: Oxford University Press, 1988. 
 Eicher, John H., and David J. Eicher, Civil War High Commands. Stanford: Stanford University Press, 2001. .
 Pfanz, Harry W. Gettysburg – The Second Day. Chapel Hill: University of North Carolina Press, 1987. .
 Warner, Ezra J. Generals in Gray: Lives of the Confederate Commanders. Baton Rouge: Louisiana State University Press, 1959. .
Mississippi History
History Central

1808 births
1882 deaths
People from Claiborne County, Mississippi
People from Itta Bena, Mississippi
United States Military Academy alumni
Democratic Party governors of Mississippi
Confederate States Army generals
People of Mississippi in the American Civil War
19th-century American Episcopalians
American people of Welsh descent
Democratic Party Mississippi state senators
Recipients of American presidential pardons
19th-century American politicians
Southern Historical Society